The High Commission of the Maldives in London is the diplomatic mission of the Maldives in the United Kingdom. It was established in 1995 by upgrading the existing Maldives Government Trade Representative's Office; it was officially opened by former Maldivian President Maumoon Abdul Gayoom.

This mission had once been called the Embassy of the Maldives in London from October 2016, when the Maldives withdrew from the Commonwealth, to February 2020.

The diplomatic mission reverted to being the High Commission of the Maldives on 1 February 2020, when the Maldives rejoined the Commonwealth.

This high commission is also covering following countries :

Gallery

References

External links
 
 
 

Maldives
Diplomatic missions of the Maldives
Maldives and the Commonwealth of Nations
Maldives–United Kingdom relations
Buildings and structures in the City of Westminster
Marylebone